Uncanny Valley is a 2015 Argentine short film directed by Federico Heller. The video was released on Vimeo on November 30, 2015.

Plot
In a dystopian future, various people addicted to virtual reality play a first-person shooter video game. Near the end of the film, the virtual reality set of one of the players malfunctions, and it is revealed that the players are remotely controlling battle robots in an actual battlefield, providing skill and tactics. The "targets" that they are shooting are actual people, including civilians. The player who discovered this then disconnects. Shortly thereafter, he is approached by a robot, presumably controlled by another player, and becomes a target.

Reception
Ross A. Lincoln of Deadline Hollywood compared the film to the novels Ready Player One and All You Need Is Kill. Meanwhile, Adi Robertson of The Verge praised the film for its combination of documentary-style footage and in-game video game footage.

After its release, the video was featured as a "Staff Pick" for the Vimeo site. In October 2016, the film won Best Short at Animago. The film was also featured at the Shnit international shortfilmfestival.

References

External links
 

2015 films
2015 short films
2015 science fiction films
Argentine short films
Argentine independent films
2010s dystopian films
Films about virtual reality
Argentine science fiction films
2015 independent films
2010s English-language films
2010s Argentine films